Brazil Without Homophobia (BWH) or Programa Brasil Sem Homophobia is an initiative launched in 2004 by the Special Secretariat for Human Rights meant to tackle homophobia through public policy.

History 
The federal government, through different ministries, works with non-governmental civil society organizations to combat violence and discrimination, promote rights and promote citizenship for the LGBT population. In 1928, sex ed became mandatory due to the concern of safe sex, and being gay. Up until the 19th century, one could serve jail time for being homosexual, and it was still considered a mental illness until 1985. It was not until 2013 that same-sex marriage was legalized, and up until 1997, sex-change surgery was illegal, and doctors would be charged with malpractice.

1988 Constitution 
The 1988 Constitution of the Brazil was created on October 5, 1988. This document addressed women's rights and minority rights. The structure of the constitution puts a large amount of focus on human rights, which paved the way for future legislature that involved specifically LGBT rights.

Program 
National conferences to promote unity between the state and the people were held in 2008 and 2011. The main goals are to:

 reinforce non-governmental institutions to battle homophobia and encourage LGBT citizens
 support members of the movements and provide education to defend the rights of citizens
 educate citizens on the rights that they have
 encourage a positive self-image, and push-back against any abuse of the rights that they have.

The program operates under the following principles:

 ensuring that public policy is made by many Ministries and Secretaries that do not discriminate against LGBT
 making accessible an education of the version of policies to be put in place about the violence and discrimination that specifically LGBT people face
 reassurance that human rights include combating homophobia, and that the State of Brazil, along with society, is committed to the eradication of these violations of human rights.

The program has been critiqued for not being as sustainable and conducive of large-scale social change due to lack of funding and focus on locality. In general, Brazil's federal system gives the Ministry of Education less power when it comes to curriculum, and more power when it comes to creating policies concerning guidelines and directions. Growing conservatism from religious organizations in opposition to Brazil without Homophobia has also been a challenge. Evangelical Congressional groups called for the suspension of distribution of educational materials for its sexual diversity programs. These programs were in partnership with the Global Alliance for LGBT Education (GALE) and two non-governmental organizations, Pathfinder and Bra. President Rousseff cancelled the distribution on television, taking heat for her choice. Activists began supporting the Workers' Party’s development of LGBT rights. Conservatism was a key reason that the Ministries of Health Education did not install condom dispensers in secondary schools with sexual diversity even though the technical staff had approved it, although the technical staff approved an HIV prevention campaign targeting gay men in the 2012 Carnival: the campaign was cancelled.

From these conferences held in 2008 and 2011 came the First National Conference of Gays, Lesbians, Bisexuals, travestis, and Transsexuals, which was held in June of 2008. In 2009, the Inter-Ministerial Technical Commission created the National Plan for the Promotion of LGBT Citizenship and Human Rights in order to battle stereotypes and discrimination on the basis of gender or sexuality, and to start writing policies to encourage human rights, and discourage homophobia. The Special Secretariat for Human Rights helped with the creation of human rights referral centers, which prevent and combat violence caused by homophobia and provides aid to victims.

Education 
The Brazilian Ministry of Education's efforts to address discrimination and violence in the public school system began in the mid-1990s with initiatives at the state and municipal level. In December of 1996, Brazil instituted a National Curriculum. The curriculum was made to create inclusive environments, and made sex ed mandatory in schools. The ministry worked to eliminate homophobia by trying to implement workshops and classes for state school teachers about preventing homophobia and respecting sexual diversity as a part of this curriculum.

The Brazilian Ministry of Education implements educational policies stemming from Brazil without Homophobia during national conferences, birthing the “School without Homophobia” program in 2008, which was signed by the National Education Development Fund.  They provide subsidies to teachers with pedagogical material in order to address the issues of homophobia within the school system. In part of the effort, The Brazilian Ministry of Education funded a nationwide study that found various acts of homophobic violence and humiliation in 501 public schools. This violence and humiliation explains why travesties in high school often feel excluded and struggle with attendance.

References

External links 

 
 
"Brazil sex education material suspended by president". Retrieved 2019-11-16.
Brazil's Constitution of 1988- https://www.constituteproject.org/constitution/Brazil_2014.pdf
 National Council for Combating Discrimination, Brazil Without Homophobia: Program to combat violence and discrimination against GLBT and promotion of homosexual citizenship. Brasília: Ministry of Health, 2004.
 Daniliauskas, M. (n.d.). Relações de gênero, diversidade sexual e políticas públicas de educação: Uma análise do programa Brasil sem homofobia. doi:10.11606/d.48.2011.tde-06072011-095913
 Irineu, B. A. (n.d.). 10 ANOS DO PROGRAMA BRASIL SEM HOMOFOBIA: NOTAS CRÍTICAS. Temporalis.
 
"Pencil, ruler, gay kit- Brazil's classrooms become a battleground in culture war". Retrieved 2019-11-15.
 
 

Social movements in Brazil
Discrimination against LGBT people
Brazilian legislation